The Man-Eater (also known as Maneater) is a 1999 Italian erotic drama film written and directed by Aurelio Grimaldi.

Cast 

 Loredana Cannata: She-Wolf 
 Arturo Paglia: Valerio
 Pascal Persiano

Production
In this movie Loredana Cannata performs several unsimulated sex acts. In reference to the infamous fellatio scene, she said that  she was told that it would not be simulated only the day they filmed it. More she revealed that also the cunnilingus she receives by  Pascal Persiano in the pool scene was real.

Arturo Paglia didn't feel up to doing the fellatio scene, so he was replaced by a porn actor.

References

External links

1999 films
Italian erotic drama films
Films directed by Aurelio Grimaldi
1990s erotic drama films
1999 drama films
1990s Italian films